Lasse Lorentz Sørensen (born 7 December 1996) is a Danish professional racing driver. He currently competes in the NASCAR Whelen Euro Series, driving the No. 66 Chevrolet Camaro for DF1 Racing in both the Elite 1 and Elite 2 class and is the defending Elite 2 Champion. Sørensen won the French F4 Championship in 2014 and has competed in categories such as Formula Ford Denmark and Eurocup Formula Renault 2.0 in the past.

Racing career
Sørensen began his career in 1998 in karting. In 2012 he switched to the Danish Formula Ford championship, he raced there from 2012–2013 ending 2nd in the standings in 2013. He also competed in the Formula Ford NEZ and Dutch Formula Ford championships that year. He switched to the French F4 Championship for the 2014 season. Sørensen won the championship that year, with 387 points.

In January 2015, Sørensen switched to the Eurocup Formula Renault 2.0, driving for Manor MP Motorsport. In 2016, Sørensen began competing in the MASCOT Danish Thundersport Championship, winning the championship in 2017 ahead from Jan Magnussen.

In 2019, he made his stock car racing debut when he took part in the second round of the 2019 NASCAR Whelen Euro Series season at Franciacorta. Driving for Dexwet-df1 Racing in the Elite 2 class, Sørensen scored a double podium finish on his debut weekend, including winning his very first NASCAR race after race leader Andre Castro suffered a mechanical issue on the penultimate lap. 

He would make his Elite 1 class debut at the following round in Brands Hatch, replacing Christophe Bouchut who left the team during the Franciacorta weekend. In Brands Hatch, Sørensen became the first Euro Series driver to win from last on the grid in Race 1 before eventually sweeping the weekend with a late-race pass on Andre Castro to win Race 2. He followed it up with his fourth victory of the season at the Sunday race in Most. Another victory would follow at Hockenheim before he win both races at Zolder to win the Elite 2 championship title by 9 points ahead of Giorgio Maggi despite missing the first two races of the season. Sørensen finished his debut season with 7 wins, 10 podiums, and Top-10 finishes in all 11 races that he took part in 2019.

Racing record

Career summary

Complete NASCAR results
(key) (Bold – Pole position. Italics – Fastest lap. * – Most laps led. ^ – Most positions gained)

Whelen Euro Series – EuroNASCAR PRO

Whelen Euro Series – Elite 2

References

External links
 
 
 Lasse Sørensen official website
 
 

1996 births
Living people
Danish racing drivers
French F4 Championship drivers
Formula Renault 2.0 NEC drivers
Formula Renault Eurocup drivers
Sportspeople from Aalborg
NASCAR drivers
Manor Motorsport drivers
MP Motorsport drivers
Auto Sport Academy drivers
Fluid Motorsport Development drivers
24H Series drivers